The Tyssen Islands lie in Falkland Sound, between West Falkland and East Falkland. They lie off Lafonia in East Falkland, and between the Swan Islands and Great Island, Falkland Islands.

References

Islands of the Falkland Islands